Götter auf Abruf is the fourth album released by the German medieval metal/industrial rock band Letzte Instanz. This was the first album of Letzte Instanz to enter the German Media Control Charts, peaking at position 81.

The album features a mix of heavy guitar sounds and classical instruments, the latter being more reminiscent of Letze Instanz's early works than the previous release.

Track listing

References

Letzte Instanz albums